Pasha Kola (also Romanized as Pāshā Kolā and Pāshā Kalā) is a village in Farim Rural District, Dodangeh District, Sari County, Mazandaran Province, Iran. At the 2006 census, its population was 86, in 33 families.

References 

Populated places in Sari County